Helyar is a surname. Notable people with the surname include:

John Helyar (born 1951), American journalist and author 
William Helyar (1559–1645), English Anglican archdeacon

See also
Helyar Almshouses
Helyer